Greg Gorman (born 1949) is an American portrait photographer of Hollywood celebrities. His work has been seen in national magazine features and covers, including Esquire, GQ, Interview, Life, Vogue, Newsweek, Rolling Stone, Time, Vanity Fair, and the London Sunday Times. Although he studied photojournalism in college, his passion for rock-and-roll led him to his chosen field when he photographed Jimi Hendrix in 1968. John Waters once said, "Greg Gorman is the only person I'd let photograph my corpse". He primarily works in black and white.

He has also directed music videos, television advertisements, and graphic design layouts for advertisers.

From 2016 to 2019 Gorman lived in a relationship with the Spanish-Catalan film impact producer Samuel Rubin.

Publications

Books
 Greg Gorman – Volume I (1989)
 Greg Gorman – Volume II (1991)
 Greg Gorman Inside Life (1996) (foreword by John Waters) 
 Greg Gorman As I see It (2001) 
 Greg Gorman Perspectives (2002)
 Greg Gorman: Just Between Us (2003) 
 Journal of the 21st Century: Greg Gorman (2007)
 The Odes of Pindar (21st Editions, 2007) 
 In Their Youth: Early Portraits (2009)

Collaborations

 No Excuses: Antonio Sabato Jr. Workout For Life by Greg Freitas and Greg Gorman (1999)
Adonis: Masterpieces of Erotic Male Photography by Michelle Olley, Horst P. Horst, Nan Goldin, and Greg Gorman (1999)

Exhibitions 
29 ARTS IN PROGRESS gallery with Photo Vogue Festival (8 November 2017 – 14 April 2018) with Gian Paolo Barbieri, Amedeo M. Turello, Lucien Clergue, William Klein.

References

External links

 "GREG GORMAN: A HOLLYWOOD ICON INTERVIEW by Lope Navo"
 PDN & Kodak Professional Legends – Greg Gorman biography
 photographerslimitededitions – Online gallery presenting Gorman's works
 Photoshop News – Interview with Greg Gorman about the New Epson Printers
 Photoshop News – Greg Gorman’s Digital Workshop in Mendocino, CA
 McMurtrie, John. "Impressive Bodies of Work: Celebrity photographer Greg Gorman aims to remove the taboo from male nudes". San Francisco Chronicle 8 October 2000.
 Professional Photographer – Greg Gorman: The evolution of an artist

1949 births
Living people
American gay artists
Photographers from California
20th-century American photographers
21st-century American photographers
American LGBT photographers